Andrey Kuznetsov was the defending champion but decided not to participate.
Pere Riba beat Santiago Giraldo 7–6(7–5), 2–6, 7–6(8–6), to win the title.

Seeds

Draw

Finals

Top half

Bottom half

References
 Main Draw
 Qualifying Draw

Distalnet Tennis Cup - Singles
2013 - Singles